= Fanny Grace Plimsoll =

British painter

Fanny Grace Plimsoll (1841–1918) was a British painter who was active in Canada between 1891 and 1913.

Plimsoll took part in the Montreal Association exhibition in 1892 and the World's Columbian Exposition in 1894. Her work is included in the collection of the National Gallery of Canada.
